Acidman (often stylized as ACIDMAN) is a Japanese rock group. The band was formed in 1997 with four members, Shiibashi Takeshi, Urayama Ichigo, Satou Masatoshi, and Ohki Nobuo. They created two demo tapes together in 1998, but former vocalist Shiibashi Takeshi left in 1999. Ohki Nobuo took his place and became the leader of the group. They continued playing live concerts, and were eventually signed to Toshiba-EMI. The band is often categorized as punk music or alternative rock but their musical style is broader and is said to blend various kinds of individual styles.

Ohki Nobuo paints many of the band's album covers.

Discography

Singles
'Sekitou' (赤橙)(24 November 2000)
To Live
Sekitou (赤橙) Meaning "Red Orange"
Kouen (公園) Meaning "The Park"
Baiyo Smash Party (培養スマッシュパーティー) Meaning "Culture Smash Party"

'Zouka ga Warau' (造花が笑う)(31 July 2002) - A limited edition
Zouka ga Warau (造花が笑う) Meaning "The Artificial Flower Laughs"

'Allegro' (アレグロ)(4 September 2002) - A limited edition
Allegro (アレグロ)

'Sekitou' (赤橙)(9 October 2002) - A limited edition
Sekitou (赤橙)

'Slow View' (12 March 2003)
Hikou (飛光) Meaning "Flying Light"
Slow View
Shizuka naru Uso to Chouwa (静かなる嘘と調和) Meaning "Quiet Lie and Harmony"

'Repeat' (リピート)(9 July 2003) - A limited edition
Nami,Shiroku (波、白く) Meaning "The Waves, White..."
Repeat (リピート)

'Suisha' (水写)(3 March 2004)
Suisha (水写) Meaning "Reflection in the Water"
Sai (彩-Sai- (inst ver.)) Meaning "Colors (instrumental version)"
Kaze,Sayuru (風、冴ゆる) Meaning "The Wind, Serene..."

'Equal e.p.' (25 August 2004)
Equal (イコール)
Coda (コーダ)
talk (inst.)

'Aru shoumei' (ある証明)(18 May 2005)
Aru shoumei (ある証明) Meaning "The Proof That's There"
Human Traffic
SOL (inst.)

'Kisetsu no Tou' (季節の灯)(19 October 2005)
Kisetsu no Tou (季節の灯) Meaning "Lamplight of the Seasons"
Spaced Out (second line)
'World Symphony' (9 November 2005)
World symphony
Turn Around (second line)

'Slow Rain' (スロウレイン)(6 September 2006)
Slow Rain (スロウレイン)
Isotope (アイソトープ)(second line)
Walking Dada (inst.)

'Prism no Yoru' (プリズムの夜) (15 November 2006)
Prism no Yoru (プリズムの夜) Meaning "The Prism-like Night"
Dawn Chorus (inst.)
Simple Story (シンプルストーリー) (second line)

'Remind' (18 July 2007)
Remind
Sekishoku Gunzou (赤色群像) (inst.)

'Unfold' (27 November 2007)
Unfold
Concord Vega (ベガの呼応) (inst.)

'Shikijitsu' (20 February 2008)
Shikijitsu (式日) Meaning "Judgment Day"
Evergreen (inst.)

'I Stand Free' (12 November 2008)
I Stand Free
O (second line)

'Carve with the Sense' (25 February 2009)
Carve with the Sense
Freak Out (second line)

'Dear Freedom' (21 July 2010)
Dear Freedom
彩-Sai-(前編)
Digest from 8th album (2010 winter)

'Alma' (22 September 2010)
Alma
彩-Sai-(後編)
Digest from 8th album (2010 winter) No.2

'Alchemist' (アルケミスと) (19 September 2012)
Alchemist (アルケミスと)
Equal (second line)
Your Song (acoustic)

 Meaning "New World" (12 December 2012)

swayed (second line)
Under the Rain (acoustic)

'Everlight' (16 April 2014)
Everlight
±0 (second line)
I Stand Free (acoustic)
±0 (remastering)
I Stand Free (remastering)

'Stay in my Hand' (16 July 2014)
Stay in my Hand
 (second line)
HUM (second line)
 (remastering)
HUM (remastering)

 Meaning "The Night the World Ends" (24 September 2014)

type-A (Second line)
 (Acoustic)
type-A (Remastering)
 (Remastering)

Miniature albums
'Sanka Zora' (酸化空)(6 March 2002)
8 to 1
Ima,Toumei ka (今、透明か) Meaning "Is It Transparent Now?"
Silence
Sanka Zora (酸化空) Meaning "Oxidized Sky"
Free White

Albums
Sou (創)(30 October 2002)
8 to 1 Completed
Zouka ga Warau (造花が笑う)
Allegro (アレグロ)
Sekitou (赤橙)
Background (バックグラウンド)
At
Spaced Out
Kouro (香路) Meaning "The Fragrant Road"
Simple Story (シンプルストーリー)
Silence
Yureru Kyutai (揺れる球体) Meaning "Shimmering Orb"
Your Song

Loop (6 August 2003)
Type-A
Nami,Shiroku (波、白く)
Isotope (アイソトープ)
Hikou (飛光)
Slow View
Repeat (リピート)
16185-O
O
Swayed
Dried Out (ドライドアウト)
Ima,Toumei ka (今、透明か)
Turn Around

Equal (15 September 2004)
0=All
Freak Out
Furu Aki (降る秋) Meaning "Falling Autumn"
Equal (イコール)
Suisya (水写)
Sai Zenpen (彩-Sai-(前編)) Meaning "Colors (Part 1)"
Sai Kouhen (彩-Sai-(後編)) Meaning "Colors (Part 2)"
Akatsuki o Nokoshite (暁を残して) Meaning "Leaving Behind the Dawn"
Colors of the Wind (from the "Mosh Pit on Disney" album.  Cover of the song from Pocahontas)
Migration 10 64
Cps
Mawaru,Meguru,Sono Kaku e (廻る、巡る、その核へ) Meaning "To That Spinning, Moving core"

And World (7 December 2005)
Introduction
World Symphony
Id (Id-イド-)
River
Kisetsu no Tou (季節の灯) Meaning "Light of the Seasons"
SOL (inst.)
Ginga no Machi (銀河の街) Meaning "The City of the Milky Way"
Natsu no Yoin (夏の余韻) Meaning "Memories of Summer"
Platanus (プラタナス)
Water Room (inst.)
Stay on Land
Aru Shoumei (ある証明)
And World

Green Chord (7 February 2007)
Green Chord (introduction)
Returning
Ride the Wave
Slow Rain (スロウレイン)
Real Distance
So Far
Prism no Yoru (プリズムの夜)
AM2:00 (inst.)
Dawn Chorus (inst.)
Sen Nen Hokou (千年歩行)
Kenmei no Mei (懸命の銘)
Calm
Toward

Life (16 April 2008)
Life (The Beginning)
Remind
Stromatolite (ストロマトライト)
Free Star
Shikijitsu (式日)
Walk
Room NO.138(inst.)
Machi No Rinkaku (街の輪郭)
Old Sunset (オールドサンセット)
Kin'iro No Capella (金色のカペラ)
Unfold
To the World's End
Life (The Ending)

A Beautiful Greed (29 July 2009)
A Beautiful Greed (Introduction)
±0
Carve with the Sense
Who Are You?
Under the Rain
Fantasia 

Hum
Ucess (inst.)
Bright & Right
I Stand Free
Over

Alma(1 December 2010)
 Meaning "The Last Country"
 Meaning "When the Wind Blows"
One Day
Dear Freedom
 Meaning "Christmas"
Alma
 Meaning "Pure White Night"
 Meaning "Legato Forest"
Final Dance Scene
 Meaning "The Year 2145"

 Meaning "New World" (27 February 2013)
gen to(intro)
SUSY

NO.6

 Meaning "The People Chasing the Wind (Part one)"
 Meaning "The People Chasing the Wind (Part two)"
 Meaning "Further ~Before Night Comes~"
 Meaning "Your True Colors"

 Meaning "White Light"
to gen(outro)

 (19 November 2014)

 Meaning "Eternal Bottom"
EVERLIGHT
Stay in my hand
star rain
EDEN
 Meaning "The Night When the World Ends"

en (instrumental)
your soul
 Meaning "Twilight Town"
 Meaning "Final Scenery"

Lambda (Λ) (13 December 2017)
Phi ~introduction~
Shiroi Bunmei (白い文明) Meaning: direct translation "White Civilization" or "Pure/Bright Civilization" 
Millennium
Prana (in reference to Hindu Philosophy) Sandskrit; Meaning "Breath" "Life Force" or "Vital Principle" 
Saigo no Hoshi (最後の星) Meaning "The Final Star" or "Last Star"
Utopia
Mizu no Yoru ni (水の夜に) (album version) Meaning "Water in the Night" 
Lambda-CDM (instrumental)
Kuuhaku no Tori (空白の鳥) Meaning: direct translation "Pure White Bird"
MEMORIES
Hikari ni Naru Made (光に成るまで) Meaning: direct translation "Until it Becomes Light", or fitting translation "Into Light“
Ai wo Ryoute ni (愛を両手に) Meaning "Take hold of love in both hands"

DVD
Scene of Sou (創) (12 March 2003)
Opening (オープニング)
Ima,Toumei ka (今、透明か)
Zouka ga Warau (造花が笑う)
Allegro (アレグロ)
Sekitou (赤橙)
Slow View
Bonus Track
Scene of Loop (10 September 2003)
Hikou (飛光)
Shizuka naru Uso to Chouwa (静かなる嘘と調和)
Slow View
Nami,Shiroku (波、白く)
Repeat (リピート)
Locus of Loop
Profile
Scene of Equal (14 October 2004)
Equal (イコール)
Suisya (水写)
Colors of the Wind
[short film]
Sai Zenpen (彩-SAI-(前編))
Cps & Mawaru,Meguru,Sono Kaku e (廻る、巡る、その核へ)
Scene of "And World" (25 January 2006)
Aru Shoumei (ある証明)
Sol
Kisetsu no Tou (季節の灯)
World symphony
Water Room
Making & off shot
Scene of "Green Chord" (5 March 2007)

References

External links
Acidman Official Website - By Toshiba EMI
Keikaku Profile | Acidman
Acidman file at JaME

Japanese rock music groups
Japanese indie rock groups
Japanese alternative rock groups
Japanese punk rock groups
Musical groups established in 1997
Musical groups from Saitama Prefecture
Virgin Records artists